Andrew Michael Porter (born 17 September 1968) is an English former professional footballer turned coach and manager who is now a first-team coach at  club Nantwich Town. His playing career spanned from 1986 to 2006 and for the majority of his career he played for Port Vale. His successes with the club include winning promotion out of the Third Division via the play-offs in 1989, lifting the Football League Trophy in 1993, and playing in the final of the Anglo-Italian Cup in 1996. He later played for Wigan Athletic, Mansfield Town, Chester City, Northwich Victoria, and Kidsgrove Athletic.

He served Port Vale as co-caretaker manager alongside Dean Glover. He managed Kidsgrove Athletic in 2002–03, and has also spent short periods as caretaker manager at Chester City, Port Vale and York City. He worked as assistant manager to Martin Foyle at Hereford United from June 2012 to March 2014.

Playing career

Port Vale
Born in Holmes Chapel, Cheshire, Porter joined Port Vale as a youngster after being released by Manchester City. He made his Football League debut in December 1986, and played on loan in New Zealand with Hutt Valley United to gain first team experience. He signed a professional contract with Vale on 29 June 1987. He went on to have a long association with the Vale Park club, with fansite OneValeFan describing how he "gave passion, power and energy to a Vale side and as a result he was often moved around the midfield". On 24 November 1992, he scored in a 3–1 win over Potteries derby rivals Stoke City in an FA Cup first round replay; he later said "that goal against Stoke meant a lot".

His spell with Vale had been one of the most successful the club had enjoyed for many years, including appearances at Wembley Stadium, FA Cup giant killing acts and twice winning promotion to the second tier of English football. He captained the club in the 1996 Anglo-Italian Cup Final, as Vale lost 5–2 to Genoa. He enjoyed a testimonial match against Derby County in 1996. On 26 December 1996, he performed a successful man-marking job on Manchester City's Georgi Kinkladze to keep the Georgian quiet and help Vale to record a 1–0 win. His 432 appearances in all competitions means he has the sixth most appearances of any Vale player over all competitions. He was also known by his nickname of "Goober".

Later career
Porter moved on to Wigan Athletic in July 1998 but struggled to establish himself at the club and spent time on loan with Mansfield Town in October 1999 before ending the season on loan with Chester City, but he was unable to help them avoid relegation to the Conference. In October 2000 he joined Chester on a permanent basis and helped the club win the Nationwide Variety Club Trophy at the end of the season. On 27 December 2001, Porter was named as Chester's joint caretaker manager alongside Dean Spink following the sacking of Steve Mungall, and their first and only match in charge was a 3–1 home win over Hayes on 29 December. They remained in this position until Owen Brown and Alan Lewer took temporary charge on 4 January 2002.

Despite Porter scoring a winning penalty against Barnet the following month, he was soon deemed surplus to requirements by manager Mark Wright and spent time on loan with Northwich Victoria. He joined Kidsgrove Athletic on loan in September 2002, before later becoming a coach at the club.

Coaching and managerial career

He was appointed as caretaker player-manager at Kidsgrove alongside Terry Hillman after they sacked Dave Nolan on 14 November 2002 and was offered the job permanently on 31 December 2002. He resigned as manager on 28 March 2003, with Bernard Taylor being appointed as his successor. Following his spell at Kidsgrove manager, Porter returned to Port Vale as a youth coach. In December 2004, Porter made a playing comeback when he replaced Levi Reid early in Vale's 3–1 win over Tranmere Rovers. Over the next two seasons he made three more Football League and two FA Cup appearances under manager Martin Foyle, his former teammate at Vale. A move to Nantwich Town in March 2006 was blocked by Foyle as the club were short-staffed.

Following these brief cameos Porter settled down to his duties as youth coach and achieved a large amount of success with the youth team in 2007 and 2008. In the summer of 2007 the youth team entered the prestigious Irish youth tournament the Foyle Cup, beating AFC Bournemouth 1–0 in the under-18s final to claim the trophy. Porter also steered the team to a club record quarter final appearance in the FA Youth Cup, beating Premier League academy sides Bolton Wanderers (3–2 at the Reebok Stadium) and Tottenham Hotspur (1–0 at Vale Park) along the way, before losing to eventual finalists Chelsea 5–2.

Porter's charges then won the Midland Youth Cup for the first time in decades, beating Lincoln City 6–5 on a penalty shootout after a 1–1 draw at Sincil Bank. He had also taken charge of the reserve side for the majority of the 2007–08 season, and managed to finish second in The Central League Midland Division in front of several higher-placed clubs and clubs with youth academy status.

Following Lee Sinnott's departure as manager, Porter and Dean Glover were appointed as caretaker managers on 23 September 2008. He was in the running for the role on a permanent basis, but it was eventually handed to Glover on 6 October. Porter departed as manager of the Port Vale youth team on 24 December. He later cited his reasons for doing so as being rejected for the managerial position earlier in the season and also not being offered the role of assistant manager, despite his success with the youth team, coupled with a need to advance his career.

He teamed up again with Martin Foyle after being appointed as York City's assistant manager on 30 December. Glover was sacked as Vale manager in May 2009 and Porter applied for the vacant position once again. However chairman Bill Bratt was determined to hire a manager of experience and so Porter was not considered for the role. He took over as caretaker manager at York on 24 September 2010 following Foyle's resignation and his first game in charge was a 3–1 victory away at Tamworth the following day. After two weeks in charge, on 6 October 2010, Porter also left the club.

On 12 February 2011, Porter turned out for Alsager Town in their North West Counties Football League Premier Division 2–0 defeat to Glossop North End. The 42-year-old played for the full ninety minutes as a favour to the club, who put out a makeshift first eleven after a period of disarray. Later in the year he was appointed as a youth coach at Stockport County.

In June 2012, Foyle appointed Porter as his assistant when he took over his new role as manager of Hereford United. He left the club when Foyle departed as manager in March 2014. The following year he began helping Foyle in his dual roles at Port Vale and Northampton Town, coaching the under-11's at the Port Vale academy and doing regional scouting for Northampton. He was appointed onto the coaching staff at Nantwich Town in January 2022.

Career statistics

Managerial statistics

Honours

As a player
Port Vale
Football League Third Division play-offs: 1988–89
Football League Trophy: 1992–93

References

1968 births
Living people
People from Holmes Chapel
Sportspeople from Cheshire
English footballers
English expatriate footballers
Expatriate association footballers in New Zealand
Association football midfielders
Manchester City F.C. players
Port Vale F.C. players
Wigan Athletic F.C. players
Mansfield Town F.C. players
Chester City F.C. players
Northwich Victoria F.C. players
Kidsgrove Athletic F.C. players
Alsager Town F.C. players
English Football League players
National League (English football) players
Association football player-managers
English football managers
Chester City F.C. managers
Kidsgrove Athletic F.C. managers
Port Vale F.C. managers
York City F.C. managers
English Football League managers
National League (English football) managers
Association football coaches
Association football scouts
Port Vale F.C. non-playing staff
York City F.C. non-playing staff
Hereford United F.C. non-playing staff
Northampton Town F.C. non-playing staff